José Rafael de Silva Fernández de Híjar y Palafox, 12th Duke of Híjar (Madrid, 29 March 1776 – Madrid, 16 September 1863), was a Spanish noble, Director of the Prado Museum between 1826 and 1838 and Sumiller de Corps between 1824 and 1854.

Biography 
He was the second son of Pedro de Alcántara de Silva Fernández de Híjar y Abarca de Bolea, IX Duke of Híjar and Rafaela de Palafox y Croy d'Havré. He unexpectedly became Duke of Híjar, when his elder brother Agustín Pedro Fadrique, X Duke of Híjar died in 1817 and his brother's only daughter Francisca Javiera, XI Duchess of Híjar died in 1818.

He was a senator, a Knight in the Order of the Golden Fleece and the Order of Santiago. He fought against the French and reached the rank of lieutenant general.

In 1824, King Ferdinand VII of Spain made him Sumiller de Corps and in 1826, he became Director of the Prado Museum. During his period as director, the museum acquired the Christ Crucified by  Velázquez, and the collection of María Teresa de Borbón, 15th Countess of Chinchón. He kept the museum's collection together in the uncertain times following the death of King Ferdinand VII of Spain.

He married in 1801 to Juana Nepomucena Fernández de Córdoba Villarroel Spínola y la Cerda (1785–1813), condesa de Salvatierra, and had 3 children:
 Cayetano de Silva y Fernández de Córdoba (1805–1865), XIII Duke of Híjar 
 Andrés Avelino de Silva y Fernández de Córdoba (1806–1885), Duke of Aliaga 
 María Antonia de Silva y Fernández de Córdoba (born 1808).

Sources
 
 Museo del Prado

1776 births
1863 deaths
Directors of the Museo del Prado
Spanish nobility
Knights of the Golden Fleece of Spain